A point of view shot (also known as POV shot, first-person shot or a subjective camera) is a short film scene that shows what a character (the subject) is looking at (represented through the camera). It is usually established by being positioned between a shot of a character looking at something, and a shot showing the character's reaction (see shot reverse shot). The technique of POV is one of the foundations of film editing.

Subjectives
A POV shot need not be the strict point-of-view of an actual single character in a film. Sometimes the point-of-view shot is taken over the shoulder of the character (third person), who remains visible on the screen. Sometimes a POV shot is "shared" ("dual" or "triple"), i.e. it represents the joint POV of two (or more) characters.

Point-of-view, or simply p.o.v., camera angles record the scene from a particular player's viewpoint. The point-of-view is an objective angle, but since it falls between the objective and subjective angle, it should be placed in a separate category and given special consideration. A point-of-view shot is as close as an objective shot can approach a subjective shot—and still remain objective. The camera is positioned at the side of a subjective player—whose viewpoint is being depicted—so that the audience is given the impression they are standing cheek-to-cheek with the off-screen player. The viewer does not see the event through the player's eyes, as in a subjective shot in which the camera trades places with the screen player. He sees the event from the player's viewpoint, as if standing alongside him. Thus, the camera angle remains objective, since it is an unseen observer not involved in the action." 
—Joseph V. Mascelli, The Five C's of Cinematography

Supporting narrative elements are required to indicate the shot to the viewer as a POV shot. These may include shot sequencing, sound effects, visual effects and acting.

Leading actor POV
When the leading actor is the subject of the POV it is known as the subjective viewpoint. The audience sees events through the leading actor's eyes, as if they were experiencing the events themselves. Some films are partially or totally shot using this technique, for example the 1947 film noir Lady in the Lake, which is shot entirely through the subjective POV of its central character in an attempt to replicate the first-person narrative style of the Raymond Chandler novel upon which the film is based.

Technology

POV footage has existed since the first cameras were mounted in early airplanes and cars, anywhere a film’s creator intended to take viewers inside the action with the psychological purpose of giving viewers a feel of "What he or she is going through", he or she being a participant in the subject matter. Cameras were increasingly introduced into more difficult experiences.

Dick Barrymore, an early action filmmaker akin to Warren Miller, experimented with film cameras and counter weights mounted to a helmet. Barrymore could ski unencumbered while capturing footage of scenery and other skiers. Though the unit was heavy relative to its manner of use, it was considered hands-free, and worked.

Numerous companies have developed successful POV designs, from laparoscopic video equipment used inside the body during medical procedures, to high tech film and digital cameras mounted to jets and employed during flight. On professional levels, the equipment is well defined, expensive, and requires intensive training and support.

However the race for hands-free POV cameras for use on a consumer level has always faced problems. The technology has had issues with usability, combining lenses with microphones with batteries with recording units; all connected using spidery cables, which proved cumbersome in use when compared to the quality of the end content.

Notable examples
In making 1927's Napoléon, director Abel Gance wrapped a camera and much of the lens in sponge padding so that it could be punched by other actors to portray the leading character's point of view during a fist fight, part of a larger snowball fight between schoolboys including young Napoleon. Gance wrote in the technical scenario that the camera "defends itself as if it were Bonaparte himself. It is in the fortress and fights back. It clambers on the wall of snow and jumps down, as if it were human. A punch in the lens. Arms at the side of the camera as if the camera itself had arms. Camera K falls on the ground, struggles, gets up." In the scenario, "Camera K" refers to Gance's main photographer, Jules Kruger, who wore the camera mounted to a breastplate strapped to his chest for these shots.

POV shots were used extensively by Alfred Hitchcock for various narrative effects.

In Dr. Jekyll and Mr. Hyde (1931), director Rouben Mamoulian uses a beginning point-of-view shot.
 
The long running British sitcom Peep Show is filmed entirely in point-of-view shots.

The film Friday the 13th often showed the killer's perspective, and the killer was not revealed until the end. Often POV shots are used in horror and thriller movies to make the audience see only that much which one person sees, adding in to the suspense.

The Plainclothesman, an early US television series, assumed the title character's POV.

Enter the Void (2009) by Gaspar Noé is shot from the first-person viewpoint, although in an unusual way, since most of the movie involves an out-of-body experience.

The action film Hardcore Henry (2015) consists entirely of POV shots, presenting events from the perspective of the title character, in the style of a first-person shooter video game.

Nearly the entire film Maniac is shot from the murderer's point of view, with his face being shown only in reflections and occasionally in the third person.

The documentary I Didn't See You There (2022) is shot from the physical perspective of director Reid Davenport, largely from his electric wheelchair. The film expands the scope of point-of-view cinema towards a disabled aesthetic generated by Davenport's embodiment.

See also

 Camera angle
 Camera operator
 Dutch angle
 Kuleshov effect

References

Film editing
Cinematic techniques
Point of view